Timothy J. Friday (born March 5, 1961) is an American retired ice hockey defenseman. He played in 23 games in the National Hockey League with the Detroit Red Wings during the 1985–86 season. Friday was on two championship teams, the RPI Engineers in the NCAA and the Adirondack Red Wings of the American Hockey League.

Professional career

Minor league hockey
After graduating from Marian High School in 1979, where he was a star player, Friday decided to attend Rensselaer Polytechnic Institute and join their Division I ice hockey team, the Engineers. He was known for being a responsible defenseman in his own end of the ice and for finding the space for a quick pass up to the forwards. He played for the Engineers all four years he was at R.P.I. and helped lead them to an NCAA Championship in 1985. Friday posted his best numbers in 1985, amassing 34 points in 36 games.

Reaching the NHL
After the celebration at Rensselaer settled down, the celebration for Friday continued when the Detroit Red Wings signed him as a free agent on May 27, 1985. However, the celebration would be short-lived. After playing 23 games for Detroit, Friday was involved in a collision during a game against the Philadelphia Flyers on Dec 3, 1985. He injured his shoulder in the hit, but wanted to continue playing.

Detroit sent him down to their minor league affiliate the Adirondack Red Wings for the remainder of the 1985–86 season. There, Friday again found his form and contributed 33 points in the remaining 43 games, and in the playoffs recorded six assists as Adirondack won their second American Hockey League championship in six games over the Hershey Bears. However, Friday never let on at any time during the season that his shoulder was getting worse and after winning the Calder Cup, decided to retire, barring further injury.

After hockey
Currently Friday is owner of Water Street Wine & Spirits in Framingham, Massachusetts.

Career statistics

Regular season and playoffs

Awards and honors

References

External links
 

1961 births
Living people
Adirondack Red Wings players
American men's ice hockey defensemen
Detroit Red Wings players
Ice hockey players from California
Ice hockey players from Massachusetts
NCAA men's ice hockey national champions
People from Framingham, Massachusetts
RPI Engineers men's ice hockey players
Sportspeople from Burbank, California
Undrafted National Hockey League players